Newlands Cricket Ground (known as Six Gun Grill Newlands for sponsorship reasons) in Cape Town is a South African cricket ground. It is the home of the Western Province and MI Cape Town. It is also a venue for Test matches, ODIs and T20Is. Newlands is regarded as one of the most beautiful cricket grounds in the world, being overlooked by Table Mountain and Devil's Peak. It is close to Newlands Stadium, which was a rugby union and football venue. The cricket ground opened in 1888. In March 2019, it was announced that the owners of Newlands Cricket Ground, the Western Province Cricket Association, went into partnership with Sanlam, to form a new office-block development as part of the cricket ground.

Official name
The ground's official name is "Six Gun Grill Newlands" as of October 2020, acknowledging a commercial sponsorship arrangement with a local maker of spices and seasonings. Previously it was known as "PPC Newlands" in a deal with a cement firm, "Sahara Park Newlands" after a computer company, and "Liberty Life Newlands" when an insurance company held the naming rights. It is still often referred to by its historic name, simply "Newlands".

History
The title deed for the land currently containing the ground was granted to a brewer, Jacob Letterstedt in 1845, who then presented it to his daughter, Lydia Corrina, as a wedding present upon her marriage to the Vicomte de Montmort.

The land, partly wetland and heavily wooded, was rented to the Western Province Cricket Club in 1887 for £50, with a 25-year lease being signed in 1888 and the rental increased to £100. Each of the club's life members contributed £25 towards the costs, and a further £350 was received in donations towards the construction of a pavilion.

The ground was levelled and officially opened with a two-day match between Mother Country and Colonial Born, which went on to become a regular feature. There was no scoreboard, and a pond existed behind the location of the current scoreboard.

Before the arrival of the Australians in 1902, which included Victor Trumper, the pine trees, which extended from the "B" field along Camp Ground Road and around the pavilion, were replaced by oak trees. This is the site of the current Oaks Enclosure, one of the most popular vantage points. A then-record crowd of 10 000 arrived to see the Test.

Between 1991 and 1997 numerous changes were made to the ground. Large portions of the grass embankments were replaced by pavilions increasing the seating capacity to 25,000.

In March 2019, it was announced that an office block development would be added to the historic cricket ground, as an addition to the existing stadium, making Newlands Cricket Ground a mixed-use precinct. The mixed-use precinct is owned by South African investment company, Sanlam (51%) and the Western Province Cricket Association (49%).

Test cricket
The ground hosted its first Test match on 24 March 1889 when England defeated South Africa by an innings and 202 runs. There have been 55 Test matches played at the ground of which South Africa has won 23, their opponents 21 and 11 which ended in a draw. The last team to beat South Africa there was England in January 2020.

Limited over cricket
The first One Day International played at the ground was on 7 December 1992 when South Africa beat India by 6 wickets. As of June 2019, there have been 41 One Day Internationals played at the ground including five in the 2003 Cricket World Cup. South Africa has won 30 of its ODI games here and lost 6 (India being the most recent opposition victor in February 2018).

Newlands is one of the few cricket grounds in South Africa that tends to favour spinners. Most grounds tend to favour pacemen or batsmen, but the Western Cape has had a history of having very good spinners, a recent example being Paul Adams.

Office Block Development 
In July 2016, the City of Cape Town approved the rezoning application to transform the Newlands Cricket Ground into a sustainable mixed-use sport, commercial, education and leisure-orientated precinct. The cricket field and surrounding seating were specifically excluded from any form of development.

In March 2019 that the Newlands Cricket Ground would become a mixed-use precinct, extending beyond a cricket stadium, thanks to a commercial development and partnership between Sanlam and the Western Province Cricket Association

The first phase of the development is expected to be completed in December 2020, whilst the long-term plan for the Newlands Cricket Ground development will see further upgrades to the historic cricket ground that will take the project into 2024.

According to the official website for the commercial development, JSE-listed AdvTech is the anchor tenant for the redevelopment.

Other sports
The ground has also hosted exhibition matches in Australian rules football. In 1998, a crowd of 10,123 saw the  play .

Gallery

See also 

List of Test cricket grounds
List of international cricket centuries at Newlands Cricket Ground
List of international cricket five-wicket hauls at Newlands Cricket Ground

References

External links 
Newlands Cricket Ground - official cricket website
Newlands Cricket Ground - official mixed-use precinct website
Cricinfo ground profile

Sports venues in Cape Town
Cricket grounds in South Africa
South Africa
Test cricket grounds in South Africa
Sports venues completed in 1888
Newlands, Cape Town
2003 Cricket World Cup stadiums
19th-century architecture in South Africa